The ABC Under-18 Championship 1998 is the 15th edition of the ABC's junior championship for basketball. The games were held at Kolkata, India from 5–13 November 1998.

Preliminary round

Group A

Group B

Group C

Group D

Quarterfinal round

Group I

Group II

Group III

Group IV

Classification 5th–14th

13th place

11th place

9th place

7th place

5th place

Final round

Semifinals

3rd place

Final

Final standing

Awards

Most Valuable Player:  Yao Ming
Best Playmaker:  Yuta Tabuse
Best Scorer:  Fumio Murayama
Best Coach:  Ma Lianbo

References
 FIBA Archive

FIBA Asia Under-18 Championship
1998–99 in Asian basketball
International basketball competitions hosted by India
1998 in Indian sport
November 1998 sports events in Asia